Ugly Nephew Records is an independent record label based in both London and New York City.   It is intended to play host to a small community of artists in order to facilitate their promotion and releases. 
The label currently hosts a variety of folk and electronic acts such as Southern Tenant Folk Union and The Zetland Players.

See also 
 List of record labels

External links
 Official site

American independent record labels
Folk record labels
Electronic music record labels